Voice over LTE (VoLTE) is an LTE high-speed wireless communication standard for mobile phones and data terminals, including Internet of things (IoT) devices and wearables. VoLTE has up to three times more voice and data capacity than older 3G UMTS and up to six times more than 2G GSM. It uses less bandwidth because VoLTE's packet headers are smaller than those of unoptimized VoIP/LTE. VoLTE calls are usually charged at the same rate as other calls. It use the SIP protocol.

To be able to make a VoLTE call, the device, its firmware, and the mobile telephone providers on each end, as well as the inter-carrier connectivity must all implement the service in the area, and be able to work together. VoLTE has been marketed as HD Voice by some carriers, but this is not the same as the VoLTE standard. Moreover, HD+ (EVS) is used only in LTE; HD Voice was available in 3G too.

Overview 
VoLTE is based on the IP Multimedia Subsystem (IMS) architectural framework, with specific profiles for control and media planes of voice service. This facilitates VoLTE on the LTE wireless broadband service defined by GSMA in PRD IR.92. The approach results in the voice service (control and media planes) being delivered as data flows within the LTE data bearer, with no dependency on (or ultimately, requirement for) the circuit-switched voice network to be in the call path.

As of February 2019 there were 253 operators investing in VoLTE in 113 countries globally, including 184 operators with commercially launched VoLTE-HD voice service in 87 countries, up from 137 operators in 65 countries 12 months previously, according to data from the Global Mobile Suppliers Association. By August 2019, these numbers had risen to 262 operators investing in VoLTE in 120 countries and 194 operators with launched VoLTE-HD voice services in 91 countries.

History 
Beginning in August 2012, MetroPCS launched the world's first commercial VoLTE services in Dallas, Texas, in the United States, alongside the first VoLTE phone, the LG Connect 4G. In May 2014, Singtel introduced the world's first commercial "full-featured" VoLTE service in Singapore, only in combination with Galaxy Note 3, it was subsequently expanded. In June 2014, KT showcased the world's first cross-border roaming services based on Voice over LTE. The South Korean operator partnered with China Mobile to develop VoLTE roaming services.

In November 2014, Verizon and AT&T announced the companies are enabling VoLTE-to-VoLTE connections between their respective customers. VoLTE interoperability between Verizon and AT&T customers began in 2015. Testing and design were performed between both companies using third party networks such as Alcatel-Lucent. This was stated to have been completed in November 2017.

On July 11, 2015, SEATEL Cambodia announced the world's first commercial 100% VoLTE service without 2G/3G in Cambodia.

As of 2020, almost all new phones for sale have the potential to support VoLTE.

By December 31, 2022, Verizon Wireless plans to retire their 2G and 3G CDMA networks in favor of 4G LTE and 5G NR. Customers with CDMA-only devices (as well as older 4G LTE that do not have HD Voice capability) will be required to upgrade their devices by the shutoff date. Verizon stopped activating CDMA-only devices on their network in 2018, and had previously planned to shut down 3G service in 2019, but extended the timeline for shutting down the 3G network twice — first to December 31, 2020, and then to December 31, 2022, which the VP of Network Engineering says "will not be extended again." The company indicated the delays were in an effort to "minimize disruptions" to its customers still utilizing the 3G network. Less than 1% of Verizon's customers were still using 3G, as of March 2021, and many of the 3G-connected devices are integrated devices, such as smart utility meters and home burglar alarms.

Voice quality 
To ensure compatibility, 3GPP demand at least AMR-NB codec (narrow band), but the recommended speech codec for VoLTE is Adaptive Multi-Rate Wideband (AMR-WB), also known under the trademark HD Voice after GSMA's certification program. This codec is mandated in 3GPP networks that are capable of 16 kHz sampling.

In addition, many carriers and devices can use Enhanced Voice Services (EVS). This is a up to superwideband (50–14,000 Hz) or fullband (20–20,000 Hz) codec backwards-compatible with AMR-WB. This codec is also known under the trademark HD Voice+, after GSMA's certification program. GSMA has proposed to make EVS mandatory just like AMR-WB. (Both the carrier(s), any interconnect and the two calling devices must be capable of using the codec for it to be used.) The AMR-WB+ codec has a wide bit-rate range, from 5.2 to 48 kbit/s.  EVS offers a wide range of bit rates from 5.9 kbit/s to 128 kbit/s, allowing service providers to optimize network capacity and call quality as desired for their service, so VoLTE doesn't ensure high call quality.

Fraunhofer IIS has previously demonstrated an implementation of the  codec in VoLTE that they call "Full-HD Voice". It has not gained any standard status or real-world adoption. They have since reused the term "Full-HD Voice" for EVS in fullband mode (HD+ is also used).

See also 

 QoS Class Identifier (QCI) – the mechanism used in VoLTE networks to allocate proper Quality of Service to bearer traffic
 Voice over NR 
 Video over LTE
 Wideband audio
Enhanced Voice Services
List of LTE networks

References 

LTE (telecommunication)
Mobile technology
Telecommunications-related introductions in 2012
Voice over IP